The following is the qualification system for the Wrestling at the 2023 Pan American Games event, along with a list of qualified wrestlers per weight category.

Qualification system
A total of 168 wrestlers will qualify to compete at the games. The winner of each weight category at the 2021 Junior Pan American Games in Cali, Colombia qualified directly, along with the top four at the 2022 Pan American Wrestling Championships and 2023 Pan American Wrestling Championships. The host country (Chile) is guaranteed a spot in each event, but its athletes must compete in both the 2022 and 2023 Pan American Championship. If Chile does not qualify at any of the first two events, it will take the fourth spot available at the 2023 Pan American Championships. A further six wildcards (four men and two women) will be awarded to nations without any qualified athlete but took part in the qualification tournaments.

Qualification timeline

Qualification summary

Men's freestyle events

57 kg

65 kg

74 kg

86 kg

97 kg

125 kg

Men's Greco-Roman events

60 kg

67 kg

77 kg

87 kg

97 kg

130 kg

Chile qualified at the 2022 Pan American Championships, therefore all four spots were available at the 2023 Pan American Championships.

Women's freestyle events

50 kg

53 kg

57 kg

62 kg

68 kg

76 kg

External links
2022 Pan American Championships results

References

P
P
P
Qualification for the 2023 Pan American Games
Wrestling at the 2023 Pan American Games